The Ear of Dionysius is a  limestone cave carved out of the Temenites hill in the city of Syracuse, on the island of Sicily in Italy.  Its name, given by the painter Michelangelo da Caravaggio, comes from its similarity in shape to the human ear. The name is also linked to the acoustic effects inside the cave: it is said that people's voices echo up to 16 times.

Geology

The Ear of Dionysius was most likely formed out of an old limestone quarry. It is 23 metres high and extends 65 metres back into the cliff. Horizontally, it bends in an approximate "S" shape, vertically it is tapered at the top like a teardrop. Because of its shape the Ear has extremely good acoustics, making even a small sound resonate throughout the cave.

Purpose
This cave was dug in Greek/Roman times as a water storage for Syracuse. A narrow tunnel was dug first. This tunnel was widened by digging down and sideways afterwards, giving the cave its unusual shape. The small narrow tunnel is still visible on the top of this artificial cave. An earthquake struck this area causing damage, and the cave became unusable for water storage afterwards.

History
The name of the cave was coined in 1608 by the painter Caravaggio after mathematician, antiquarian and archaeologist, Vincenzo Mirabella took Caravaggio to visit the grotto. It refers to the tyrant Dionysius I of Syracuse. According to legend (possibly one created by Caravaggio), Dionysius used the cave as a prison for political dissidents, and by means of the perfect acoustics eavesdropped on the plans and secrets of his captives. Another more gruesome legend claims that Dionysius carved the cave in its shape so that it would amplify the screams of prisoners being tortured in it. Unfortunately, the sound focusing effect can no longer be heard because access to the focal point is no longer possible. The visitors of the cave can however still hear the echo while they are in the Ear of Dionysius.

Because of its reputation for acoustic flawlessness, the Ear of Dionysius has also come to refer to a type of ear trumpet that has a flexible tube. The term 'Ear of Dionysius' can also refer to surveillance, specifically that for political gain.

See also
List of caves
List of caves in Italy

Notes

References

External links

Description of acoustics on Sound Tourism site
A guide to visiting the Ear of Dionysius

Caves of Italy
Archaeological sites in Sicily
Buildings and structures in Syracuse, Sicily
Ancient Syracuse